St. Peter's Cemetery may refer to:
 St. Peter's Cemetery (Halifax), Nova Scotia
 St. Peter's Cemetery (Jefferson County, Arkansas), on the National Register of Historic Places
 Saint Peter's Cemetery (Jersey City, New Jersey)
 St. Peter's Cemetery (Lewiston, Maine)
 St. Peter's Cemetery (Staten Island), New York
 Petersfriedhof Salzburg, Austria
 St. Peter's Cemetery in the Wajee Nature Park, Baden-Powell grave